Chyšky (formerly Malá Chýška) is a municipality and village in Písek District in the South Bohemian Region of the Czech Republic. It has about 1,100 inhabitants.

Administrative parts
Villages and hamlets of Branišov, Branišovice, Hněvanice, Hrachov, Kvašťov, Květuš, Mezný, Nálesí, Nosetín, Nová Ves, Podchýšská Lhota, Radíkovy, Ratiboř, Ratibořec, Rohozov, Růžená, Vilín, Voděrady and Záluží are administrative parts of Chyšky.

References

Villages in Písek District